The 2011 season was the New Orleans Saints' 45th in the National Football League, their 36th playing home games at the Mercedes-Benz Superdome and their sixth under head coach Sean Payton. In Week 16, Drew Brees broke the single-season passing record previously held by Dan Marino; Brees ended the season with 5,476 passing yards, an NFL record. The team also broke the record for offensive yards from scrimmage with 7,474 and Darren Sproles broke the record for all purpose yards, with 2,696. The Saints also finished second in scoring for total points with 547, and finished second for points per game with 34.2 points and sacks with 24.

The Saints improved on their 11–5 finish from a season earlier and won the NFC South Division with a 13–3 record, and went undefeated at home, so there was much talk of the Saints potentially winning a second Super Bowl in three seasons. Despite their impressive record, however, New Orleans failed to receive a first-round bye due to losing tiebreakers with the San Francisco 49ers for the #2 seed in the NFC behind the 15–1 Green Bay Packers. The Saints won their first playoff game against the Detroit Lions in the Wild Card round but fell to the 49ers on a last-minute touchdown in the Divisional Playoffs. The Saints finished with a final record of 14–4.

Offseason

2011 draft

 The Saints acquired this first-round selection in exchange for its second-round selection (#56 overall) and a 2012 first-round selection.
 The Saints acquired this third-round selection and a conditional 2012 sixth-round selection in a trade that sent OT Jammal Brown and a 2011 fifth-round selection (#155 overall) to the Washington Redskins.
 The Saints traded its fourth-round selection (#121 overall) to the Jacksonville Jaguars in exchange for a 2010 fifth-round selection.
 The Saints traded its sixth-round selection (#189 overall) to the New England Patriots in exchange for TE David Thomas.
 Compensatory selection.

Schedule

Preseason

Regular season

Game summaries

Week 1: at Green Bay Packers

The Saints began their 2011 campaign at Lambeau Field, taking on the defending Super Bowl champion Green Bay Packers in the annual NFL Kickoff Game. New Orleans trailed early in the first quarter as Packers QB Aaron Rodgers completed a 7-yard touchdown pass to wide receiver Greg Jennings. The Saints answered with quarterback Drew Brees finding wide receiver Robert Meachem on a 31-yard touchdown pass, but Green Bay struck back with Rodgers completing a 32-yard touchdown pass to wide receiver Randall Cobb. New Orleans clawed their way back into the game in the second quarter with a 30-yard field goal from kicker John Kasay, followed by running back Darren Sproles returning a punt 72 yards for a touchdown. However, the Packers came right back with running back James Starks getting a 17-yard touchdown run.

The Saints led off the third quarter with Kasay's 38-yard field goal, but Green Bay replied with Cobb returning a kickoff 108 yards for a touchdown. Afterwards, New Orleans kept fighting as Brees connected with wide receiver Devery Henderson on a 29-yard touchdown pass. In the fourth quarter, the Packers replied with fullback John Kuhn getting a 1-yard touchdown run. New Orleans tried to rally as Brees found tight end Jimmy Graham on a 5-yard touchdown pass, but Green Bay's defense held stuffing a potentially game tying Ingram run on the 1-yard line on the last play of the game to preserve the win.

With the loss, the Saints began their season at 0–1.

Week 2: vs. Chicago Bears

Coming off a loss to the Green Bay Packers, the Saints hosted the Chicago Bears in week 2. Falling early, Drew Brees responded with a 79-yard touchdown pass to Devery Henderson. The Saints defense got six sacks on Jay Cutler and wore down the Bears defense to beat them 30–13. In this rematch of the NFC Championship Game 5 seasons earlier, this was the first time in Drew Brees' career that he beat the Bears with the Saints.
With the win, the Saints improved to 1–1.

Week 3: vs. Houston Texans

With the win the Saints improved to 2–1.

Week 4: at Jacksonville Jaguars

With the win the Saints improved to 3–1.

Week 5: at Carolina Panthers

A NFC South rivalry rookie Cam Newton and Drew Brees go head to head for the first time. After an early lead DeAngelo Williams starts a comeback with a 69-yard touchdown run. Former Carolina kicker John Kasay kicked two straight field goals, and then Cam Newton ran for a touchdown. Then, Cam Newton threw a touchdown pass to take the lead. Then, Drew Brees led the Saints down to the redzone and with less than a minute, threw a 6-yard touchdown pass to Pierre Thomas to win the game.

Week 6: at Tampa Bay Buccaneers
The Saints lose to the Buccaneers following an injury Sean Payton sustained during a sideline collision.

Week 7: vs. Indianapolis Colts

The Saints hosted the Colts in a rematch of Super Bowl XLIV. With the win, The Saints improved to 5–2
In a game against the currently winless Indianapolis Colts (0–7), the Saints began the game with recovering a fumbled snap by Curtis Painter. The Saints would convert that turnover into a touchdown with a 14-yard pass from Drew Brees to Marques Colston. The Saints would continue again with a 4-yard TD pass from Drew Brees to Marques Colston. Then Delone Carter fumbled and the Saints recovered for their second fumble recovery of the game, and their next TD of the night came with a 6-yard pass from Brees to Darren Sproles, as the Saints convert another turnover into points begin the game and end the first quarter 21–0. The Saints would continue with a Jed Collins 1-yard run and a field goal, but the Colts would score with a Delone Carter 2-yard run. The Saints would end the first half with another John Kasay field goal. The Saints would outscore the Colts 28–0 in the second half, with the Saints outscoring the Colts 14–0 in each of the second half quarters. Drew Brees would throw a 4-yard and a 2-yard TD pass to Jimmy Graham. In the fourth quarter, Darren Sproles ran 16 yards for a TD, and with under 13 minutes left in the fourth quarter, Leigh Torrence intercepted a pass from Curtis Painter and returned it 42 yards for a touchdown as the Saints ousted the Colts 62–7 and wins the game with the most points in a single game in franchise history. Drew Brees finished the game 31/35 for 325 yards and 5 touchdowns with no interceptions. The Saints also rushed for 236 yards with 2 touchdowns, with Mark Ingram's 91 yards, Darren Sproles' 88 yards and Pierre Thomas' 57 yards. The New Orleans Saints offense gained 557 yards of total offense, and ran 73 plays, and gained 36 first downs and was also 6/8 in third-down efficiency.

As of 2022, this is the most recent game in which a team scored 60 or more points.

Week 8: at St. Louis Rams

After a franchise record setting performance the Saints went to face another winless team, the St. Louis Rams. This time, however, the Rams pulled off one of the biggest upsets in this NFL season, as their defense kept the Saints scoreless during the first half, and then the Rams sealed the deal with a 27-yard interception return for. With this defeat the Saints fell to 5–3, however this would be the last time the Saints would lose in the regular season.

Week 9: vs. Tampa Bay Buccaneers

Week 10: at Atlanta Falcons

Week 12: vs. New York Giants

Week 13: vs. Detroit Lions

Week 14: at Tennessee Titans

Week 15: at Minnesota Vikings

Week 16: vs. Atlanta Falcons

During this game, Drew Brees set the record for most passing yards in a season, breaking the previous record set by Dan Marino.

Week 17: vs. Carolina Panthers

Standings

Postseason

Schedule

Game summaries

NFC Wild Card Playoff Game: vs. #6 Detroit Lions

Entering the postseason as the NFC's #3 seed, the Saints began their playoff run at home in the NFC Wild Card Round against the #6 Detroit Lions, in a rematch of their Week 13 contest.

New Orleans trailed early in the first quarter with Lions quarterback Matthew Stafford completing a 10-yard touchdown pass to tight end Will Heller. The Saints answered with a 2-yard touchdown run from running back Darren Sproles, but Detroit replied with Stafford completing a 13-yard touchdown pass to wide receiver Calvin Johnson. New Orleans would close out the half with a 24-yard field goal from kicker John Kasay.

The Saints took the lead in the third quarter with quarterback Drew Brees finding wide receiver Devery Henderson and tight end Jimmy Graham on a 41-yard and a 3-yard touchdown pass, while the Lions tried to stay close as Stafford got a 1-yard touchdown run. Afterwards, New Orleans would pull away in the fourth quarter with a 17-yard touchdown run from Sproles, followed by Brees connecting with wide receiver Robert Meachem on a 56-yard touchdown pass. Detroit tried to rally with Stafford completing a 12-yard touchdown pass to Johnson, and following this, the Lions attempted an onside kick, but the Saints recovered the kick. The Saints were still able to drive down the field and closed out the game with a 1-yard touchdown run from running back Pierre Thomas.

With the win, New Orleans improved its overall record to 14–3.

NFC Divisional Playoff Game: at San Francisco 49ers

Staff

Final roster

Awards
 Offensive Player of the Year – Drew Brees

Records

Team
 Most yards gained, season, 7,474
 Most yards gained, passing, season, 5,347
 Most passes completed, season, 472
 Highest completion percentage, season, 71.3
 Most first downs, season, 416
 Most first downs, passing, season, 280
 Most points at home, season, 329
 Most points per home game, season, 41.1
 Most points, single team, game, since AFL–NFL merger, 62 (vs Indianapolis Colts) Oct. 23, 2011 (tied with four other teams)

Individual

Drew Brees
 Most passing yards, season: 5,476
 Most consecutive games, 300+ yards passing: 7
 Most consecutive games, 350+ yards passing: 4
 Most consecutive games, 400+ yards passing: 2 (tied)
 Most games, 250+ yards passing, season: 16
 Most games, 350+ yards passing, season: 8
 Most games, 300+ yards passing, season: 13
 Most games, 30 or more pass attempts, season: 16 (tied)
 Most pass completions, season: 468
 Most consecutive games 20 completions: 36 (2009–present)
 Most games 20 completions, season: 16 (tied his own 2010 record)
 Most games 30 completions, career: 29 (2005–present)
 Most games 30 completions, season: 9
 Most games 30 completions and no interceptions, career: 14 (2006–present)
 Most games with 30 completions and no interceptions, season: 5 (tied)
 Highest completion percentage, season: 71.2 (468 for 657)
 Most games with more than 80% pass completion rate, career (minimum 20 passes per game): 12 (2004–present)
 Most games with more than 80% pass completion rate, season (minimum 20 passes per game): 3
 Most consecutive seasons 4,000+ yards: 6 (2006–2011)
 Most career seasons 5,000+ yards: 2
 Most games, 350+ yards passing, career: 29
 Most games, 5+ TD passes, career 7, (2004–present)
 Most games, 1+ TD passes, season 16 (tied)
 Most seasons, 45+ touchdown passes, 1 (tied)
 Most consecutive playoff games, 2+ touchdown passes 7 (tied) (2006–2011)
 Most consecutive passes, none intercepted, post-season: 226 (January 21, 2007 – January 14, 2012)
 Most games with 400 yards passing and no interceptions, career 4 (tied)
 Most games with 5 touchdown passes and no interceptions, career 5 (2004–present)
 Most games with 30 completions and no interceptions, career 14 (2006–2011)
 Passing yards in a single month 1,687 (October 2011)

Darren Sproles
 Most yards gained, total, season: 2,696

Notes and references

New Orleans
NFC South championship seasons
New Orleans Saints seasons
New